The 2021 Porsche Carrera Cup North America was the first Porsche Carrera Cup North America season, sanctioned by the International Motor Sports Association (IMSA) which in turn replaced both Porsche GT3 Cup Challenge USA & Porsche GT3 Cup Challenge Canada. It began on March 19 at Sebring International Raceway and ended on November 12 at Road Atlanta.

Teams and drivers

The following teams and drivers were signed to run the 2021 season.

Race calendar and results
The revised calendar was announced on September 25, 2020.

Final Standings

Notes

References

External links

Porsche Supercup seasons
Porsche